The 2017 European Youth Summer Olympic Festival was held in Győr, Hungary, between 23 July and 30 July 2017.

Sports
 130 set of medals

Venues

Schedule
The competition schedule for the 2017 European Youth Olympic Summer Festival is as follows:

Participant nations

Medal table

Note, 12 teams without medals were:

Mascot
Hugoo the rooster will be the mascot for this edition of European Youth Summer Olympic Festival. Rooster was chosen as the mascot based on the local legend of the Iron Rooster.

References

External links

 
European Youth Summer Olympic Festival
European Youth Summer Olympic Festival
European Youth Summer Olympic Festival
Youth Summer Olympic Festival
Multi-sport events in Hungary
European Youth Summer Olympic Festival
Sport in Győr
European Youth Summer Olympic Festival
European Youth Summer Olympic Festival